The 1982 Carlton Football Club season was the Carlton Football Club's 119th season of competition, and 86th as a member of the Australian Football League. Carlton fielded teams in the senior, reserves and under-19s grades of the 1982 VFL season, and its senior team also contested the 1982 Escort Championships.

Carlton won the senior VFL premiership, defeating  in the Grand Final. It was the club's second senior VFL premiership in a row, its third in four years, and the 14th in the club's history.

Club summary
The 1982 VFL season was the 86th season of the VFL competition since its inception in 1897; and, having competed in every season, it was also the 86th season contested by the Carlton Football Club. As it had been since 1897, the club's home ground was Princes Park in North Carlton; additionally, it was standard for all clubs in the league at the time to play three or four matches per year at the neutral VFL Park in Mulgrave. 
In addition to contesting the VFL premiership, the Carlton senior team contested the 1982 Escort Championships, which ran concurrently with the premiership season. Carlton also fielded teams in both the VFL reserves competition (the Statewide Cup) and the VFL under-19s competition.

Carlton's key senior personnel were all unchanged from 1981: Ian Rice as club president, David Parkin as senior coach, and Mike Fitzpatrick as captain. Australian Prime Minister Malcolm Fraser was the club's No. 1 ticket holder.

Squad and player statistics for 1982
The following is the final senior squad as announced at the start of the 1982 season, plus mid-season transfers. Numbers in parentheses represent games played and goals kicked for Carlton in the 1982 VFL premiership season.

Playing list changes
The following summarises player transfers to and from the club between the conclusion of the 1981 season and the conclusion of the 1982 season.

In

Out

Season summary

Pre-season matches
Carlton played four competitive matches in the lead-up to the 1982 VFL season – three practice matches and an Escort Cup match.

Home-and-away season
Carlton entered the season as the defending premiers. After a slow start, Carlton climbed to the top of the ladder and cemented its position as premiership favourites with nine consecutive wins (plus one in the Escort Cup) between Rounds 3 and 11. Their form remained patchy, and after heavy upset losses to Geelong and the Swans, Carlton dropped to third. They were considered a serious risk of losing the double chance, with difficult games in the last three weeks of the season, but an upset win over first-placed Richmond in Round 20, and an unexpectedly heavy victory over fifth-placed North Melbourne saw Carlton hold onto third place, and regain form going into the finals.

Finals series
Despite being below Hawthorn on the ladder, Carlton's form in the final rounds of the home-and-away season meant it was favourite to win the qualifying final, which it did by a comfortable margin. They were then comprehensively beaten by minor premiers Richmond in the second Semi-final; Richmond led by 30 points at quarter time, and the final margin of 23 points was not reflective of Richmond's overall dominance on the day.

The preliminary final against Hawthorn was a tough, ugly game of football which divided opinions; the Sun reporters Lou Richards and Tom Prior were critical of both teams for their poor skills, but their Sun colleague Don Scott described it as a classic preliminary final, finding the tightly defensive contest enthralling. Only five goals were scored in the first half arm-wrestle, before Carlton opened up a big lead with six goals to two in the third quarter, ultimately winning by 31 points.

In the Grand Final, Richmond led a close game by 11 points at half time, aided by Carlton's inaccurate goalkicking – the score was 9.4 (58) to 6.11 (47). Carlton then added five goals to zero in the third quarter to lead by 17 points, maintaining roughly this margin to the final siren to win the premiership.

Commonwealth Games
Eleven days after the season was over, Carlton played a Grand Final rematch against Richmond as a demonstration sport at the 1982 Commonwealth Games in Brisbane. Richmond won the high-scoring match by eighteen points.

Escort Championships
Carlton participated in the 1982 Escort Championships, which ran concurrently with the VFL season. Carlton reached the semi-final stage before being eliminated by North Melbourne.

Ladder

Premiership team
The Carlton premiership twenty was as below.

For the second consecutive season, both Geoff Southby and Rod Austin were missing from the premiership team due to injury. Southby was injured in the semi-final, as he had been in 1981; Austin had been widely considered best on ground in the preliminary final, but was hospitalised after he suffered a flare-up of a groin complaint which he had carried into that match.

Notable events
Controversial finish in Round 1 draw against Fitzroy
In the Round 1 match at Princes Park,  overcame a 32-point half-time deficit to hit the lead late in the match, but Carlton drew the game with a behind on the final siren from Greg Wells. Fitzroy complained about the game-tying behind for three separate reasons: that the free kick from which Wells scored the behind was a wrong decision; that after Wells played on, the kick was actually taken after the siren had sounded because the siren wasn't loud enough to be heard; and that the kick, which fell short and went through off the hands of a pack, was deliberately forced through for a score by a Carlton player and should have been a dead ball. There was no formal protest against the result, and the VFL endorsed the umpires' decision in all three cases.

Death of Robert Dickson
Crowd behaviour at VFL matches was put under the spotlight after the death of 28-year-old father Robert Dickson. Dickson, an innocent bystander to a brawl in the crowd of the Round 1 match between Carlton and Fitzroy at Princes Park, was king-hit as he tried to protect his six-year-old son from the violence. He was released from hospital after the incident, but suffered an aneurysm a week later and died in hospital in late April. Dickson's autopsy did not connect his aneurysm to the trauma suffered in the brawl, but the incident nevertheless served as a trigger for the VFL and police to review behavioural standards of patrons at VFL matches, which had been poor in recent years. From 4 May, patrons were banned from bringing alcoholic beverages into VFL matches, and were limited to purchasing at most two pre-opened cans at a time from vendors at the ground. The Carlton and Fitzroy Football Clubs and the VFL all donated money to Dickson's widow.

Retirement and reinstatement of Warren Jones
Ruckman Warren Jones retired briefly during the season. He was dropped to the reserves for the Round 12 Queen's Birthday Monday match against  after allegedly breaking a team curfew, and submitted a letter of resignation to the club on Tuesday. After meeting with the club hierarchy, he withdrew his resignation on the Thursday, and went on to play in the premiership team three months later.

Wayne Johnston's suspension in the qualifying Final
Wayne Johnston was reported for striking  defender David Polkinghorne in the face during the qualifying Final. Polkinghorne gave evidence against Johnston at the tribunal, and Johnson was suspended for two matches, meaning that he would potentially miss the Grand Final if Carlton qualified for it by winning the second Semi-final. There was surprise and some backlash among players and football media about Polkinghorne's frank testimony against Johnston, as there was generally considered to be an unspoken "code of silence" discouraging players giving incriminating evidence against their opponents at the tribunal. As Carlton ultimately lost the second Semi-final and won the Preliminary Final, Johnston was able to come back into the team for the Grand Final.

Speculation over David Parkin's coaching future
The Collingwood Football Club endured a tumultuous 1982 season, with coach Tommy Hafey sacked at mid-season due to the club's poor on-field performances, followed by a successful spill at board level by a group known as the New Magpies. The media speculated extensively on the new board making a big money move to poach a successful senior coach from another club, and Parkin, whose contract with Carlton was finishing, was one of the key targets. On 20 September, the Sun reported that a deal for Parkin to move to Collingwood in 1983 was all but signed off, only to be forced to publish a retraction two days later when Carlton signed him to remain with the club until 1985.

Streaker at the Grand Final
The third quarter of the Grand Final was famously interrupted when Helen d'Amico, a 17-year-old Adelaide-based stripper, streaked onto the field, naked except for a Carlton scarf. She went up to and accosted Bruce Doull, before Wayne Johnston dragged her from the field. d'Amico was fined $1000, and the incident is now a memorable moment of Grand Final folklore.

Exhibition match at the Commonwealth Games
Early in the season, the VFL arranged for the Grand Finalists to play a rematch at the 1982 Commonwealth Games, which were being held in Brisbane shortly after the season was finished. Carlton and Richmond faced off in the exhibition match at the Gabba on Wednesday, 6 October, in front of a sell-out crowd of 15,000 – including the Duke of Edinburgh – and an international television audience in the millions.

The Gabba playing surface was much smaller than typical VFL-sized grounds because of the dog track around the perimeter, so it was possible to score from the centre of the ground. This, coupled with the exhibition nature of the match which emphasised spectacular and skillful play ahead of ferocious defence, resulted in a very high scoring match. Carlton kicked eleven goals to four in the third quarter to take a 17-point lead into three-quarter time, before Richmond kicked ten goals to five in the final quarter to win the match by 18 points, 28.16 (184) to 26.10 (166). Richmond received $20,000 as winners of the match; Carlton received $10,000.

Leading Goalkickers 
Full forward Ross Ditchburn was Carlton's leading goalkicker for 1982, achieving the feat in his first season of VFL football, and despite playing only half of Carlton's matches for the season. A farmer from country Western Australia, Ditchburn had played several seasons of WANFL football, but had returned to his family's farm in his small home town of Kukerin in 1981. He was already tied to Carlton if he ever came to Victoria, and at age 25 he decided he needed to make the attempt at VFL football in 1982 before he became too old to have a reasonable chance at it. Ditchburn initially struggled, and by Round 14, he had played only one senior game for one goal, and was considered too slow to play his preferred position of centre half forward at the top level. He was nearly cleared back to Western Australia at mid-season, but was instead moved to full-forward where he was able to cement a regular place in the team for the last twelve games of the season. He kicked a total of 61 goals in his thirteen senior games for the year; he also kicked 44 goals for the reserves, for a season total of 105 goals across both grades.

Team awards and records
Game records
Round 9 – Carlton's first quarter score of 12.5 (77) against  set a new record for the highest first quarter score in VFL history.
Round 18 – Carlton's score of 30.21 (201) against  was the second time it had scored more than 200 points in a VFL match.
Round 18 – Carlton's 129-point win against  set a new record as Carlton's greatest winning margin in a VFL match.
Round 18 – Carlton's half-time score of 18.11 (119) set a new record for Carlton's highest score in a half of football.
Round 18 – Carlton's 92-point half-time lead against  was the highest half time lead for any team since Round 2, 1931.
Season – Carlton's scores of 30.21 (201) in Round 18, 27.23 (185) in Round 9 and 26.24 (180) in Round 21 were at the end of the season the second-highest, third-highest and fourth-highest scores in Carlton's history.

Unofficial game records
Carlton's two exhibition matches against Richmond – the pre-season match in Swan Hill, and the post-season at the Commonwealth Games – were very high scoring. These are not considered formal senior games, but when compared with VFL premiership matches:
Carlton's losing scores in both matches – 23.23 (161) and 26.10 (166) – were higher than the VFL record at the time, which was 23.19 (157).
The aggregate score of the post-season match, 54.26 (350), was higher than the VFL record at the time, which was 52.33 (345).

Premiership records
Carlton won its 14th senior VFL premiership, surpassing  (13) to become the club with the most senior premierships VFL history. It was the first time Carlton had held the outright premiership lead (after drawing level with Collingwood for the lead in 1981).
Carlton won back-to-back premierships in 1981–82. It was the first time the club had achieved the feat since 1914–15, and the first time any team had achieved the feat since Richmond in 1973–74.

Individual awards and records
Robert Reynolds Trophy
The Robert Reynolds Trophy for Carlton's senior best and fairest was awarded to Jim Buckley. It was the first and only time that Buckley won the club best and fairest. Buckley won the award despite missing six games, including a horror September in which he suffered bouts of glandular fever, mild hepatitis and a thigh injury, which caused him to miss two finals matches and a significant amount of training; he was in doubt leading up to the Grand Final, but was able to take his place in the premiership team.

Representative honours
There were two interstate matches played during the season: Victoria vs South Australia on 17 May; and Victoria vs Western Australia on 13 July. The matches were played under partial State of Origin rules. Carlton players and coaches who were selected in these games were:
David Parkin – coached Victoria in both games
Jim Buckley – represented Victoria against Western Australia
Mike Fitzpatrick – captained Victoria against South Australia; represented Western Australia against Victoria
Ken Hunter – represented Victoria against South Australia
Alex Marcou – represented Victoria against Western Australia
Phil Maylin – represented South Australia against Victoria

Player records
Round 16 – Ross Ditchburn kicked twelve goals against . He became the third player to kick twelve goals in a game for the club, after Horrie Clover (13, in 1921) and Greg Kennedy (12, in 1972). Ditchburn achieved the feat in only his third senior VFL appearance.

Lower grades
The Carlton reserves team finished sixth out of twelve teams, narrowly missing the final five with a record of 11–10–1. The Under-19s team finished fifth with 56 premiership points, and was eliminated by Fitzroy in the elimination final to finish fifth overall.

Under-19s finals matches

Footnotes
1. During 1982, the South Melbourne Football Club was in transition as it moved to Sydney to become the Sydney Swans. Although it played all of its premiership season home games in Sydney in 1982, the club was still known as South Melbourne until 2 June, after which it was known as simply the Swans. It formally became the Sydney Swans prior to the 1983 season.

References

Carlton Football Club seasons
1982 in Australian rules football